Huang Sheng-hsiung (born 3 December 1990) is a Taiwanese baseball pitcher. He was drafted by the EDA Rhinos with the third overall pick in the 2013 CPBL draft.

Huang represented Taiwan at the 2012 Haarlem Baseball Week, 2014 Haarlem Baseball Week, 2012 Italian Baseball Week, 2013 East Asian Games and 2017 World Baseball Classic.

References

External links 

1990 births
Living people
Baseball pitchers
EDA Rhinos players
Fubon Guardians players
People from Taitung County
Taiwanese baseball players
2017 World Baseball Classic players
21st-century Taiwanese people